Enteroxenos is a genus of very small parasitic sea snails, marine gastropod mollusks in the family Eulimidae.

Description
These small snails have no mouth or gut, and absorb nutrients through their body wall. These odd animals look much more like worms than snails, but the larval form is a veliger, which is characteristic of mollusks.

Species
Species within this genus include the following:
 Enteroxenos bouvieri (Risbec, 1953)
 Enteroxenos muelleri (Semper, 1868)
 Enteroxenos oestergreni Bonnevie, 1902
 Enteroxenos parastichopoli (Tikasingh, 1961)

Species brought into synonymy
 Enteroxenos ostergreni (Bonnevie, 1902): synonym of Enteroxenos oestergreni (Bonnevie, 1902)

Reproduction
The females become hosts to the smaller males, which then fertilise their eggs.

References

External links
 First page of a 1964 paper in Transactions of American Microscopical Society about a species in this genus
 The original 1902 paper (in German) describing the species
 Nomenclator Zoologicus info on the genus
 To World Register of Marine Species

Eulimidae
Gastropod genera